Rutherford is a census-designated place (CDP) in Napa County, California, United States. The population was 164 at the 2010 census.

Rutherford is located in the Rutherford AVA (American Viticultural Area) which is located in the larger Napa Valley AVA. The Robert Mondavi Winery is located between Rutherford and neighboring Oakville (though its corporate headquarters are in nearby St. Helena).  Other notable wineries in the Rutherford area include Beaulieu Vineyard, Grgich Hills Estate, St. Supéry Estate Vineyards & Winery, and Inglenook. The Auberge du Soleil restaurant and resort is located in Rutherford.

Rutherford's zip code is 94573. It is inside area code 707.

History
Rutherford is located within the  Mexican land grant Rancho Caymus deeded to the early Napa Valley settler George C. Yount from General Mariano Guadalupe Vallejo in 1838 as payment for a variety of services. Yount gave a  portion of the grant to his granddaughter Elizabeth and her husband Thomas Rutherford in 1864 as a wedding present. The Rutherfords planted vineyards and made wine in the late 1800s.

Geography
According to the United States Census Bureau, the CDP covers an area of 1.7 square miles (4.4 km), 99.76% of it land, and 0.24% water.

Demographics
The 2010 United States Census reported that Rutherford had a population of 164. The racial make-up of Rutherford was 123 (75.0%) White, 0 (0.0%) African American, 0 (0.0%) Native American, 0 (0.0%) Asian, 0 (0.0%) Pacific Islander, 30 (18.3%) from other races and 11 (6.7%) from two or more races. Hispanic or Latino of any race were 70 persons (42.7%).

The census reported that 164 people (100% of the population) lived in households, 0 (0%) lived in non-institutionalized group quarters and 0 (0%) were institutionalized.

There were 71 households, of which 21 (29.6%) had children under the age of 18 living in them, 36 (50.7%) were opposite-sex married couples living together, 7 (9.9%) had a female householder with no husband present, 4 (5.6%) had a male householder with no wife present.  There were 0 (0%) unmarried opposite-sex partnerships, and 0 (0%) same-sex married couples or partnerships. 24 households (33.8%) were made up of individuals, and 7 (9.9%) had someone living alone who was 65 years of age or older. The average household size was 2.31.  There were 47 families (66.2% of all households); the average family size was 2.89.

37 people (22.6%) were under the age of 18, 11 (6.7%) aged 18 to 24, 30 (18.3%) aged 25 to 44, 57 (34.8%) aged 45 to 64 and 29 (17.7%) were 65 years of age or older. The median age was 45.7 years. For every 100 females, there were 105.0 males. For every 100 females age 18 and over, there were 101.6 males.

The homeowner vacancy rate was 0% and the rental vacancy rate was 2.4%. 71 people (43.3% of the population) lived in owner-occupied housing units and 93 people (56.7%) lived in rental housing units.

Government

References

External links

 

Census-designated places in Napa County, California
Napa Valley
California wine
Census-designated places in California